John Dinham may refer to:

 John Dinham (1359–1428), knight from Devonshire, England
 John Dinham (1406–1458), knight from Devonshire, England